Alucita jujuyensis is a moth of the family Alucitidae. It is found in Argentina.

References

Moths described in 1954
Alucitidae
Moths of South America